Nicola Campinoti (born 20 May 1992 in Massa) is an Italian footballer who plays as a midfielder for Massese.

References

External links
 L'Aquila Calcio profile

1992 births
Living people
People from Massa
Italian footballers
Association football midfielders
A.C.N. Siena 1904 players
L'Aquila Calcio 1927 players
Sportspeople from the Province of Massa-Carrara
Footballers from Tuscany